Tervel Ivaylov Dlagnev (born November 19, 1985) is an American freestyle wrestler, who represented the United States in the 125 kg weight division. He earned a bronze medal at the 2012 Olympic Games in London, and finished 5th at the 2016 Olympic Games in Rio.

Early life
Dlagnev was born in Bulgaria, and at the age of four moved with his family to the United States. He went to Arlington High School in Arlington, Texas, where he took up wrestling as a way to lose weight. Dlagnev only wrestled three years in high school, where he finished third and fourth at the Texas state championships in 2003 and 2002, respectively.

College career
Dlagnev was a four-time All-American and a two-time NCAA Division II national champion in the heavyweight division for the University of Nebraska at Kearney (UNK) in 2007 and 2008; in 2008, Dlagnev led UNK to their first ever team title and helped recruit Kamaru Usman to UNK. His win secured the national championship not just for himself, but also for the University of Nebraska at Kearney wrestling team. UNK won the team title by 1/2 a point over Minnesota-State Mankato. In doing this, Dlagnev capped his senior season at a perfect 38-0.

Dlagnev was a 2006 Midlands Champion at 285 lbs. He also is one of a few non D1 wrestlers to wrestle at the NWCA All-Star Classic. At the 2007 All-Star Classic, Dlagnev defeated Wade Sauer of Cal-State Fullerton 11-7.

International career
Dlagnev has made eight national teams (Top 3 at the World Team Trials) since 2009, winning the World Team Trials each year with the exception of 2010. Dlagnev has won two bronze medals at the World Wrestling Championships, in 2009 and 2014. At the 2009 World Wrestling Championships, Dlagnev finished 4–1 with a loss in the semifinals to Fardin Masoumi, while at the 2014 World Wrestling Championships Dlagnev also finished 4–1 with a loss in the quarterfinals to eventual champion Taha Akgül.

Dlagnev finished fifth at the World Championships in 2011 and 2013, while finishing with a  third place bronze medal at the 2012 Olympics. During the wrestling competition at the 2012 Summer Olympics, Dlagnev finished in fifth place after he was pinned by Artur Taymazov from Uzbekistan in the semi-final and suffered a loss against Komeil Ghasemi from Iran in his bronze medal bout due to separated cartilage in his rib cage. On 23 July 2019 it was announced that as a result of retesting samples, Artur Taymazov had been disqualified from the 2012 Olympics for a drug violation, and his gold medal from that event also withdrawn. This result elevated Dlagnev to third place, and is now the 2012 Olympic 120 kg bronze medalist.

In 2015, Dlagnev won the United States World Team Trials but was unable to compete at the 2015 World Wrestling Championships and was replaced by Zach Rey, who was runner-up at the trials. Dlagnev also won the 2016 US Olympic Team Trials in 2016 and represented the United States at the 2016 Olympics in Brazil, where he reached the semi-finals, but again missed out on a medal after losing to Geno Petriashvili in his bronze medal bout.

Other tournaments won by Dlagnev include the US Open (2011–2015), World University Games in 2008, Pan American Games in 2011, Alexander Medved International (2010, 2013), Cerro Pelado International in 2012, and the New York AC International Open (2008–2010, 2012)

In 2019, the two-time Olympian had his 2012 Olympic results upgraded to bronze in the 120kg freestyle class following the International Olympic Committee's announcement they are stripping Uzbekistan's Artur Taymazov of his gold medal for a doping violation. Dlagnev had originally finished fifth, but Davit Modzmanashvili was stripped of his silver earlier in the year.

On 6 March 2022, Dlagnev received his 2012 Olympic bronze medal during the Olympic Medal Reallocation Ceremony in Lincoln, Neb. just prior to the final session of the 2022 Big Ten Conference Wrestling Championships.

Coaching career
Dlagnev is currently the head freestyle coach at the Ohio Regional Training Center (ORTC) and also serves as an assistant coach to Tom Ryan for Ohio State University.

References

External links
Profile at TheMat.com

1985 births
Living people
Sportspeople from Columbus, Ohio
University of Nebraska at Kearney alumni
Nebraska–Kearney Lopers wrestlers
American male sport wrestlers
Wrestlers at the 2012 Summer Olympics
Wrestlers at the 2016 Summer Olympics
Olympic bronze medalists for the United States in wrestling
Medalists at the 2012 Summer Olympics
Bulgarian emigrants to the United States
World Wrestling Championships medalists
Pan American Games gold medalists for the United States
Pan American Games medalists in wrestling
Sportspeople from Sofia
Wrestlers at the 2011 Pan American Games
Medalists at the 2011 Pan American Games